Jhoan Esteban Chaves Rubio (born 17 January 1990) is a Colombian professional road bicycle racer, who currently rides for UCI WorldTeam . Born in Bogotá, Chaves has competed as a professional since the start of the 2012 season, having signed for the  team as a neo-pro, after three seasons as an amateur with the  team. Chaves is a two-time grand tour podium finisher, and a monument winner.

Career

Early career

As an amateur, Chaves was the winner of the French Tour de l'Avenir race in 2011, a race previously won by five future winners of the Tour de France. Chaves had been part of the breakaway on the first road stage of the race, taking the mountains jersey after the stage. He surrendered that lead to Garikoitz Bravo the next day, but reclaimed the lead on the third stage, having led the field over the Grand Ballon. Bravo took the lead again after the fourth stage until the end of the race, but Chaves moved into contention for the overall honours with several top-ten stage finishes, and trailed race leader David Boily by seven seconds before the final stage, in Alba, Italy. Chaves was part of a four-rider breakaway that moved clear of the field after the penultimate climb, and although he was beaten to the line by Warren Barguil and Mattia Cattaneo, Chaves's third place, coupled with a 24-second time gap to the field, allowed him to win the race by 17 seconds.

Colombia–Coldeportes (2012–13)
Chaves turned professional with the newly formed  team for the 2012 season, as his former team  returned to the domestic ranks in Colombia. He competed in several of the early-season Italian races, including Tirreno–Adriatico, but withdrew from the race on the penultimate day. After finishing 18th in his home race, the Vuelta a Colombia, Chaves returned to Europe for the Prueba Villafranca de Ordizia single-day race in the Basque Country. Chaves made an attack with  remaining but 's Gorka Izagirre shadowed his move, with Izagirre eventually beating Chaves in the sprint finish. Chaves continued his form into the Vuelta a Burgos, where he won the final stage of the race.  team-mates Rigoberto Urán and Sergio Henao animated the field on the final climb to Lagunas de Neila, and only Chaves was able to follow the pair; Chaves ultimately beat his former team-mate to take his first professional victory on the line, and allowed him to finish the race in third place overall. The following weekend, Chaves took victory in the Gran Premio Città di Camaiore in Italy, from a five-rider group, after forming the group with Italian national champion Franco Pellizotti of the  team, on the Monte Pitoro climb.

Chaves suffered severe injuries in a crash at the Trofeo Laigueglia in February 2013. The team doctor revealed that he had a compound fracture to his right clavicle, fractures in his left petrous bone, right cheekbone, maxillary sinuses and sphenoid bone, and also received pulmonary compressions, abrasions and suspected rib fractures.

Orica–GreenEDGE (2014–2021)
Chaves moved to the  team for the 2014 season, on an initial two-year contract.

2015

At the Vuelta a España, Chaves won stage 2 by outsprinting Tom Dumoulin and Nicolas Roche at the summit of the final third category climb of Caminito del Rey. By doing so he took the overall race lead. Chaves lost the race lead on stage 5, as he was caught out in a split in the peloton at the finish and dropped 6 seconds to Dumoulin. However, on stage 6 Chaves attacked  from the summit of the final climb to Sierra de Cazorla and held off Dan Martin and Dumoulin by five seconds for his second stage win and retake the race lead. During the Vuelta Chaves extended his contract for a further three years. He eventually finished the Vuelta in fifth place overall.

2016–2017
2016 was a strong season for him as he finished second in the Giro d'Italia and third in the Vuelta a España. On 1 October, Chaves won Il Lombardia, his – and Colombia's – first victory in one of cycling's "monuments".

In June 2017, he was named in the startlist for the Tour de France. He struggled at the event, eventually finishing 62nd in the general classification, almost two-and-a-half hours down on winner Chris Froome. He returned to the Vuelta a España later in the year. He showed good form in the opening stages, but later slipped back to finish eleventh overall.

2018
Chaves started his 2018 campaign at the Cadel Evans Great Ocean Road Race, before starting the Herald Sun Tour. He broke away from the peloton at the final ascent of the penultimate stage, taking the victory and the lead in the overall classification.  He held on to his lead to win the event overall the next day, his second victory in a stage race. Chaves also rode the Giro d'Italia as his season highlight, winning stage 6.

2019
On 31 May, Chaves won stage 19 of the Giro d'Italia from the breakaway, his first victory in over a year.

EF Education–EasyPost

Major results

2006
 2nd Road race, National Novice Road Championships
2009
 1st Stage 1 Vuelta a Cundinamarca
2010
 5th Overall Circuito de Combita
2011
 1st  Overall Tour de l'Avenir
 1st Stage 1 Clásica Club Deportivo Boyacá
 3rd Overall Circuito de Combita
2012
 1st Gran Premio Città di Camaiore
 1st  Young rider classification, Vuelta a Colombia
 2nd Prueba Villafranca de Ordizia
 3rd Overall Vuelta a Burgos
1st  Young rider classification
1st Stage 5
 5th Memorial Marco Pantani
 6th Road race, UCI Under-23 Road World Championships
2014
 1st Stage 8 Tour de Suisse
 3rd Overall Tour of Beijing
1st  Young rider classification
 4th Overall Tour de Langkawi
 7th Overall Tour of California
1st Stage 6
2015
 1st  Overall Abu Dhabi Tour
1st  Young rider classification
1st Stage 3
 Giro d'Italia
1st Stage 1 (TTT)
Held  after Stage 4
 5th Overall Vuelta a España
1st Stages 2 & 6
Held  after Stages 2–4 & 6–8
Held  after Stages 2–3 & 7–14
Held  after Stage 2
Held  after Stages 2–8
 8th Giro di Lombardia
2016
 1st Giro di Lombardia
 1st Giro dell'Emilia
 2nd Overall Giro d'Italia
1st Stage 14
Held  after Stage 19
 3rd Overall Vuelta a España
 9th UCI World Tour
2017
 2nd Overall Tour Down Under
 9th Overall Herald Sun Tour
2018
 1st  Overall Herald Sun Tour
1st Stage 3
 Giro d'Italia
1st Stage 6
Held  after Stages 6–8
2019
 1st Stage 19 Giro d'Italia
 6th Overall Tour of Slovenia
2020
 4th Overall Vuelta a Burgos
 5th Time trial, National Road Championships
 7th Overall Tour Colombia
2021
 3rd Grand Prix of Aargau Canton
 6th Overall Volta a Catalunya
1st  Points classification
1st  Mountains classification
1st Stage 4
 8th La Flèche Wallonne
 9th Overall Tour of the Basque Country
 10th Overall Tour de Suisse
2022
 National Road Championships
2nd Time trial
3rd Road race
 2nd Mont Ventoux Dénivelé Challenge
 4th Coppa Sabatini
 5th Giro della Toscana
 6th Overall Tour de Langkawi
 7th Overall Critérium du Dauphiné
 9th Overall Tour of Norway
2023
 1st  Road race, National Road Championships

General classification results timeline

Monuments results timeline

References

External links

 
 

Colombian male cyclists
1990 births
Living people
Sportspeople from Bogotá
Colombian Vuelta a España stage winners
Colombian Giro d'Italia stage winners
Cyclists at the 2016 Summer Olympics
Olympic cyclists of Colombia
Cyclists at the 2020 Summer Olympics
Tour de Suisse stage winners